The Valea Lată Sărată is a left tributary of the river Ialomița in Romania. It discharges into the Ialomița in Țăndărei. It flows through Lake Strachina.

References

Rivers of Romania
Rivers of Ialomița County